Upper Benson, also known as Benson Center, is a hamlet located in the Town of Benson in Hamilton County, New York, United States.

References

Hamlets in Hamilton County, New York
Hamlets in New York (state)